Ethmia pusiella is a moth of the family Depressariidae. It occurs throughout Europe and eastwards to the Tien Shan mountains of eastern Central Asia.

The caterpillars feed on common gromwell (Lithospermum officinale) and Pulmonaria officinalis. They have also been recorded to be myrmecophilous.

Taxonomy and systematics
Ethmia pusiella is the type species of the proposed genera Anesychia and Melanoleuca, which are now considered junior synonyms of Ethmia. If considered separate from Ethmia, the senior synonym Anesychia must be used.

Two subspecies are accepted nowadays:
 Ethmia pusiella pusiella – western populations, east to Ural Mountains and Asia Minor
 Ethmia pusiella deletella – eastern populations, Central Asia and Tien Shan

In earlier times, E. candidella and E. fumidella were considered varieties of E. pusiella.

Junior synonyms of E. pusiella are:
 Ethmia deletella de Lattin, 1963
 Ethmia lithospermella (Hübner, 1789)
 Ethmia scalacella (Kühn, 1777)
 Phalaena (Tinea) pusiella Linnaeus, 1758
 Tinea lithospermella Hübner, 1789
 Tinea scalacella Kühn, 1777

Footnotes

References
 Grabe, Albert (1942): Eigenartige Geschmacksrichtungen bei Kleinschmetterlingsraupen ["Strange tastes among micromoth caterpillars"]. Zeitschrift des Wiener Entomologen-Vereins 27: 105-109 [in German]. PDF fulltext
 Savela, Markku (2003): Markku Savela's Lepidoptera and some other life forms – Ethmia. Version of 2003-DEC-29. Retrieved 2010-APR-21.

pusiella
Moths described in 1758
Taxa named by Carl Linnaeus
Moths of Europe
Moths of Asia